Eoophyla latifascialis is a moth in the family Crambidae. It was described by Snellen in 1876. It is found on Sulawesi.

References

Eoophyla
Moths described in 1876